Nicole Jackson (born 31 August 1992) is an English ice hockey goaltender and member of the British national ice hockey team (Team GB), currently playing with Göteborg HC in the Swedish Women's Hockey League (SDHL).

Career  
In 2015, she signed with the Sheffield Steeldogs of the men's English Premier Ice Hockey League on a two-way contract allowing her to appear on loan with the Bradford Bulldogs in the men's second-tier league, the National Ice Hockey League (NIHL),  when she wasn't starting games for the Steeldogs. In 2017, she moved to Sweden to take the starting position with Göteborg HC. In 2018, she saved 72 out of 75 shots in a loss to Linköping HC and would almost repeat that performance in 2019 by making 64 saves in a loss to Luleå HF/MSSK.

References

1992 births
Living people
English women's ice hockey goaltenders
Sportspeople from Oldham
Göteborg HC players
Linköping HC Dam players